Stanislav Ivanovych Shcherbatykh (24 February 1948 – 24 January 2007) was a Ukrainian bard, an author of the Ukrainian anti-communist political satire and other humorous original songs. He is better known for his scenic name of Tryzuby Stas ("Tridental Stas"). He is also known as the Ukrainian Vysotskiy.

Biography
Shcherbatykh was born in Altai in the town of Aleysk (some sources claim Altaisk). His father was Russian, mother - a native Ukrainian. After his father was killed the Sherbatykh family moved to their relatives in Stanislaviv, Ukrainian SSR in summer of 1949. Stanislav's uncle was a warrior of the Ukrainian Insurgent Army and later spent some 10 years in Gulag camps. Stanislav graduated from a Russian-speaking school.

After finishing institute he worked as a musician in a restaurant. In 1976 Sherbatykh married a Kyivan poet Maria Huk-Shcherbatykh, originally from Lviv Oblast. In 1977 together with his wife he traveled to Kamchatka to earn extra money. There was born his son Volodymyr. In Kamchatka Sherbatykh worked as a painter, photograph, and director of the local House of Culture. In 1980 he returned to the Ukraine. In Ukraine Shcherbatykh worked in film industry, particularly - documentaries and cartoons. One of his cartoons "Sasha's Seagull" earned a bronze medal  at the international film festival "Kinomarina - 75".

By the end of the 1980s he joined the theatrical studio "Ne zhurysya!" in Lviv. From 1991 Shcherbatykh was touring together with the troupe. His scenic name Tryzuby Stas (Tri-teeth Stas) he humorously explained that he has three teeth for the next things:  one - Komsomol, second - Communist Party, and third - Trade Union. In the beginning of the 1990s Shcherbatykh astonished many by his lyric critical of government. Since the mid-1990s Shcherbatykh lived in Kyiv. He is laureate of the festival of original song "Obereh" and the music festival "Chervona Ruta", as well as a participant of the Sopot International Song Festival where he sang in Polish.

He died on January 24 (some sources state 27), 2007 in his Kyiv apartment from his third heart attack. Sherbatykh was buried near Ivano-Frankivsk at Dem'ianiv Laz, next to the victims of the Soviet repressions.

Notes

References

External links
 Profile at uamusiclib.com 
 Sample of one of his songs 
 List of his works 
 Blog of Tryzuby Stas at livejournal.com 

1948 births
2007 deaths
People from Altai Krai
People from Ivano-Frankivsk
Russian people of Ukrainian descent
Russian emigrants to Ukraine
Ukrainian male poets
Ukrainian anti-communists
20th-century Ukrainian poets
20th-century Ukrainian male singers